Dmitri Sergeyevich Goncharov (born 15 April 1975) is a Russian former professional footballer.

Club career
He made his professional debut in the Russian Second Division in 1992 for PFC CSKA-d Moscow.

Honours
 Russian Premier League bronze: 1999, 2002.

European club competitions
With PFC CSKA Moscow.

 UEFA Cup 1996–97: 1 game.
 UEFA Champions League 1999–2000 qualification: 2 games.

References

1975 births
Footballers from Dresden
Living people
Russian footballers
Russia under-21 international footballers
Association football goalkeepers
PFC CSKA Moscow players
Russian Premier League players
FC Lokomotiv Nizhny Novgorod players
FC Fakel Voronezh players
FC Spartak Moscow players
FC Spartak Vladikavkaz players
FC Kuban Krasnodar players
FC Akhmat Grozny players
FC Kristall Smolensk players